The TN 71 is a French-built thermonuclear warhead which was used on submarine-launched ballistic missiles in Redoutable class ballistic missile submarines.

It has a yield of 150 kt.

Entering service in 1985 on M4-B ballistic missiles, it was replaced at the end of October 1996 by the TN 75, which equips M45 missiles for France's Triomphant class of "new generation" ballistic missile submarines (SNLE-NG).

There were 288 operational TN 71 warheads before its replacement in 1996, and 96 in 2001, but none were remaining by 2004, at which time it was withdrawn from service.

See also 
 Force de frappe
 FOST
 List of nuclear tests#France

Nuclear warheads of France
Military equipment introduced in the 1980s